Puigverd may refer to:
 Puigverd d'Agramunt, a village in Lleida, Catalonia, Spain
 Puigverd de Lleida, a village in Lleida, Catalonia, Spain